Checkered Flag is a Formula One racing video game developed by Rebellion Developments and published by Atari Corporation for the Atari Jaguar on November 28, 1994, and later released in Japan by Messe Sansao in July 1995. It is a remake of Atari's 1991 Atari Lynx title of the same name.

Taking a more simulation-based approach compared to the original game, players compete against other racers across multiple tracks in order to finish on first place and advance to the next course. Originally advertised as a direct sequel to the Atari Lynx original, Checkered Flag went through multiple changes before settling down under its final name and it is inspired by Sega's 1992 arcade game Virtua Racing.

Checkered Flag received very mixed reception since its release. By April 1, 1995, the game has sold more than 20,000 copies though it is unknown how many were sold in total during its lifetime.

Gameplay 

Checkered Flag is a formula one racing game, similar to the Atari Lynx original and Virtua Racing, where the objective is to complete a number of laps across ten tracks but now featured in a flat-shaded three-dimensional environment, instead of 2D sprites and the remake leans towards being a racing simulator than an arcade-style racer compared to the original game, where each lap had to be completed within the time limit and the clock was extended if players made a lap before running out of time. There are six color variations for the vehicle that can be chosen at the options screen before starting a race, alongside other settings such as weather conditions, types of tire, automatic or manual transmission, number of laps and more, while players can also press the Option button at the same screen to access a configuration menu where they can change the control settings and other options as well. Records are automatically saved via the cartridge's EEPROM. During gameplay, players can choose between six different camera view by pressing their respective number on the keypad.

Modes 
There are three different modes of play to choose from at the options screen: Single Race, Free Practice and Tournament. Single Race, as the name implies, is a single race mode where players pick any track and number of laps to complete, while also competing against CPU-controlled opponents. Free Practice is essentially time trial mode, where players race against the clock in order to achieve the best time possible and practice their driving skills. Tournament is the main mode of the game, where players compete against five other opponents in order to reach first place across ten different tracks, while the number of laps is set to 10.

Development and release 

Atari Corporation were already developing and planning to release a formula one game for the Jaguar as early as August 1993, when the system was officially unveiled to the public. Originally titled Jaguar Formula One Racing, the game was still in development under its original name until October/November 1993, when it was officially revealed to the public as Checkered Flag II, a sequel to the original Checkered Flag on the Atari Lynx and was originally scheduled for a Q1 1994 release, with magazines already comparing it with Sega's Virtua Racing and Nintendo's Stunt Race FX (then titled FX Trax), with the former being released a year prior and latter being released four months before the game was launched. In a January 1994 interview by Edge magazine, it was revealed that Rebellion Software were the ones developing the title, after Atari Corp. commissioned them to develop two games for the system, with the other one being Alien vs Predator. Edge also pointed out similarities between it and Virtua Racing due to its use of flat-shaded polygons.

The game was showcased during WCES '94 and it kept being advertised under its second title and was later listed for a May 1994 release, but in a feature interview by GameFan with the developers revealed that the game went under a massive reprogramming and other graphical changes. Checkered Flag was Rebellion's second project for the Jaguar, as the company was working on two more projects for the system besides it and Alien vs Predator, with one of them being Skyhammer (then titled Hammerhead). In a June 1994 interview with Rebellion co-founder Jason Kingsley by ST Format, it was revealed that the game's title was now changed to Redline Racing, with Jason also stating that the game was created as a homage to Virtua Racing and that the lack of a two-player mode was due to the original commission by Atari Corp. to only create a driving title for only one player. The company's development team was expanded months earlier to assist with work on their internal projects, including artists Stuart Wilson, Toby Harrison-Banfield, and Justin Rae and programmers Robert Dibley, Mike Beaton and Andrew Whittaker, with both Justin working as a graphic designer and Robert as a programmer of Checkered Flag respectively.

The game was now being advertised under its third name and was also showcased during SCES '94, with previews showcasing a different look compared to the final release. GamePro magazine also pointed out that the game was developed under a low budget. In August/September 1994, the game was now being previewed under its final name and had its last trade show appearance at Autumn ECTS '94. Checkered Flag was released in November 1994 for Atari's Christmas campaign, alongside Doom, Club Drive, and Dragon: The Bruce Lee Story.

Reception 

Checkered Flag received very mixed reception since its release.

British magazine Games World gave the game 87. One of the four reviewers favored it over Virtua Racing for its faster car, and having more tracks.

Three reviewers in GameFan gave the Jaguar version 70, 65, and 62. The reviewer who gave the lowest score was rather critical at first, but later commented "If you can dial in the control, you may just grow attached to this one, it is definitely a great looking game."

Next Generation reviewed the game, and stated that "most players will find that the real challenge is in just hanging on for the ride. Racing enthusiasts need not apply."

Legacy 
A Game Boy Advance port of the Atari Lynx original was in development and planned to be released by Destination Software alongside the GBA versions of Stuntman and V-Rally under a compilation, but it was never released.

In January 2017, a ROM image of the November 1993 build of Checkered Flag II was leaked online by video game collector Clint Thompson at AtariAge.

References

External links 
 Checkered Flag at AtariAge
 Checkered Flag at GameFAQs
 Checkered Flag at MobyGames

1994 video games
Atari games
Atari Jaguar games
Atari Jaguar-only games
Commercial video games with freely available source code
Racing video games
Rebellion Developments games
Single-player video games
Video games developed in the United Kingdom
Video game remakes